The 2011 ACC Twenty20 Cup was played between 3–11 December 2011 in Nepal.  The tournament acted as a qualifying tournament for the 2012 ICC World Twenty20 Qualifier.  The tournament was won by defending champions Afghanistan who defeated Hong Kong in the final to win the tournament for a third time.  Afghanistan had already qualified for the World Twenty20 Qualifier as an Associate Member of the International Cricket Council with One Day International status.  They will be joined in the qualifying event by Hong Kong, Oman and Nepal.

Squads

Group stage

Group A

Results

Group B

Results

Semi-finals and Playoffs

9th place playoff

7th place playoff

5th place playoff

Semi-finals

3rd place playoff and Final

3rd place playoff

Final

Final standings

Statistics

Most runs
The top five highest run scorers (total runs) are included in this table.

Most wickets
The following table contains the five leading wicket-takers.

See also
2012 ICC World Twenty20 Qualifier
ACC Trophy

References

External links

International cricket in 2011–12

ACC Twenty20 Cup
International cricket competitions in Nepal
2012 ICC World Twenty20
ACC Twenty20 Cup
2011 in Nepalese sport